This list of reptiles of Texas includes the snakes, lizards, crocodilians, and turtles native to the U.S. state of Texas.

Texas has a large range of habitats, from swamps, coastal marshes and pine forests in the east, rocky hills and limestone karst in the center, desert in the south and west, mountains in the far west, and grassland prairie in the north. This vast contrast in biomes makes Texas home to an extremely wide variety of herpetofauna. Its central position in the United States means that species found primarily in either the western or eastern parts of the country often have their ranges meeting in the state. Its proximity to Mexico is such that many species found there and into Central America range as far north as Texas. The abundance of reptiles makes the state a prime area for research, and most species found in Texas have been well studied.

Texas state law protects several reptile species; threatened species are denoted with a (T) and endangered species are denoted with an (E). The climate of Texas has also led to some species being introduced and establishing a permanent population, denoted with an (I).


Crocodilians

Lizards

Snakes

Turtles

See also

List of Texas amphibians

Further reading
 Dixon, James R. 2013. Amphibians and Reptiles of Texas, with Keys, Taxonomic Synopses, Bibliography, and Distribution Maps. 3nd ed. Texas A&M University Press. College Station, Texas. viii, 477 pp. 
 Dixon, James R., John E. Werler, and Michael R. Forstner. 2020. Texas Snakes, A Field Guide, Revised Edition. University of Texas Press. Austin, Texas. xvi, 448 pp. 
 Ernst, Carl H. and Jeffrey E. Lovich. 2009. Turtles of the United States and Canada. The Johns Hopkins University Press. Baltimore, Maryland. xii, 827 pp. 
 Ernst, Carl H. and Evelyn M. Ernst. 2003. Snakes of the United States and Canada. Smithsonian Institution Press, Washington, D. C. ix, 668 pp. 
 Hibbitts, Troy D. and Toby L. Hibbitts. 2016. Texas Turtles and Crocodilians, A Field Guide. University of Texas Press. Austin. xvi, 257 pp. 
 Hibbitts, Troy D. and Toby J. Hibbitts. 2015. Texas Lizards, A Field Guide. University of Texas Press. Austin. xvi, 333 pp. 
 Jones, Lawrence L. C. and Robert E. Lovich. 2009. Lizards of the American Southwest, A Photographic Field Guide. Rio Nuevo Publishers. Tucson, Arizona. 567 pp. 
 Powell, Robert, Roger Conant, and Joseph T. Collins. 2016.  Peterson Field Guide to Reptiles and Amphibians of Eastern and  Central North America, 4rd ed. Houghton Mifflin Co., Boston, Massachusetts. xiii, 494 pp. 
 Werler, John E. and James R. Dixon. 2000. Texas Snakes, Identification, Distribution, and Natural History. University of Texas Press, Austin, Texas. xv, 437 pp.

References
Texas Memorial Museum: Herps of Texas
Texas Parks & Wildlife: Endangered and Threatened Species of Texas
Integrated Taxonomic Information System

Reptiles
Texas